Sergei Alexeyevich Ryabkov (born 8 July 1960) is a Russian politician, currently serving as the Deputy Foreign Minister of the Russian Federation since 2008.

Early life and education
Ryabkov was born in Leningrad in 1960. At age 22, in 1982, he graduated from the Moscow State Institute of International Relations. Upon graduation, he immediately joined the Russian Foreign Ministry.

Political career

In 1995, he worked in the Foreign Ministry's Department of European Co-operation. In 2002, he worked as a counselor at the Russian Embassy in Washington, DC. 
In 2006, he returned to Moscow and was appointed head of his former department (the Department of European Co-operation). He was designated Deputy Foreign Minister in 2008.

On 28 December 2021, U.S. and Russia announced bilateral talks would take place in Geneva on 10 January 2022, to discuss concerns about their respective military activity and to confront rising tensions over Ukraine. The talks were led by Ryabkov and U.S. Deputy Secretary of State, Wendy Sherman. Ryabkov said Russia has "no intention of attacking, staging an offensive on or invading Ukraine." Asked about the possibility of Russian military deployment to Cuba or Venezuela, Ryabkov said "it all depends on the actions by our US counterparts".

Personal life
Ryabkov speaks English fluently and frequently gives interviews to English-speaking media organizations. Ryabkov, for example, often appears on the channel RT. He often speaks for the Foreign Ministry in commenting on nuclear and other disarmament negotiations, specifically such things as the New START treaty.

He is married and has two children.

References

External links 
 "Spotlight: Russia-US: Setting a new agenda" published on April 1, 2009 RT (TV network) YouTube

1960 births
Living people
Moscow State Institute of International Relations alumni
Russian diplomats
Ambassador Extraordinary and Plenipotentiary (Russian Federation)